Gdud HaAvoda   was a socialist Zionist work group in Mandate Palestine.

History
Officially known as the Yosef Trumpeldor Labor and Defense Battalion, Gdud HaAvoda was established on 8 August 1920 for the purpose of Jewish labor, settlement and defense. It was named after Joseph Trumpeldor, who was killed at Tel Hai by Lebanese Shia villagers, and was joined by many of Trumpeldor's followers who had made aliyah from Crimea; initial membership was around 80. 

The group drained swamps, paved roads, worked in agriculture and construction, establishing several kibbutzim, including Tel Yosef (14 December 1921), Ein Harod (22 September 1921), Kfar Giladi and Ramat Rachel. Many former members left to join the Solel Boneh construction company after learning their trade in the battalion.

In 1923 the battalion split on ideological grounds; the left-wing demanded socialism, whilst the right-wing were more interested in Zionist pioneering. Despite the split, by 1925 the group had over 650 members, including Israel Shochat, Manya Shochat and Yitzhak Sadeh. 

In December 1926 a communist faction of the battalion was expelled. Some members of the faction returned to Russia, where they formed a commune named Vojo Nova (Esperanto for  "A New Way"), which was later liquidated during the Stalinist purges. The following year Gdud HaAvoda stopped work, and in 1929 it was dissolved after Kfar Giladi, Ramat Rachel, Tel Hai and Tel Yosef formed the HaKibbutz HaMeuhad movement.

References

Organizations established in 1920
Zionist organizations
Jewish organizations in Mandatory Palestine
Organizations disestablished in 1929
Labor Zionism
1920 establishments in Mandatory Palestine